Elections for Bexley Council were held on 6 May 2010.  The 2010 General Election and other local elections took place on the same day.

In London council elections the entire council is elected every four years, opposed to some local elections where one councillor is elected every year for three of the four years.

Summary of results

References

2010
Politics of the London Borough of Bexley
2010 London Borough council elections
May 2010 events in the United Kingdom